With prepaid mobile phone service, topping-up or reloading is needed to continue using the services of the operator. There are several ways to reload a prepaid mobile phone. The most popular process is through purchasing a prepaid card, but due to security precautions, and for convenience, electronic reloading was developed.

Development
The technology of electronic reloading was first introduced in the Philippines by Smart Communications as SmartLoad and is considered to be the world's first electronic reloading service. The service offered micro top-ups; meaning prepaid subscribers can top-up prepaid credits with small denominations. The service gained popularity and soon other service providers also adopted the technology, offering prepaid top-ups to its subscribers. SmartLoad was followed by a rival company, Globe Telecom, which introduced a better version of the top-up service called AutoloadMax or simply AMax.

Benefits
Retailers and prepaid phone subscribers both benefit from electronic reloading service.

Security
Electronic reloading does not require transfer of any actual physical prepaid cards. No more cards to be kept or safeguarded against theft.

Cost-effective
There is no need to incur costs on transportation, warehousing, or other incidental expenses that would cut into the retailer's profits because all transactions are done electronically.

Convenience
Prepaid credits are loaded automatically to the subscriber. No more long lines, no more PINs to be keyed in.

Channels of reloading

Reloading stations
Prepaid phone subscribers can top-up airtime balances via electronic reloading stations. Reloading stations or retailers uses a Retailer SIM card in topping up prepaid credits to a subscriber's mobile phone. The functions of this SIM is also identical to the prepaid SIM cards offered commercially but with added reloading/top-up functionality. It uses click-and-browse SIM technology to perform hassle-free transactions.

A retailer enters the number of the mobile phone to be reloaded and then chooses either the denomination of airtime balance or a pre-subscribed prepaid offer: e.g. in terms of call and text promos, for example Smart AllNet30, mobile internet promos, for example Smart Giga Video 50 and some of their prepaid broadband offer top-ups such as FamLoad Video, a prepaid internet promo for Smart Bro Home WiFi.

The airtime balance reload will then be deducted from the retailer's commercial load credits which can also be reloaded from a network's wireless centers (but in some cases in the Philippines, Smart Stores don't cater to such a method of reload in favor of Machine Topup or Scratch Cards locally called Prepaid Vouchers). The commercial load is the prepaid airtime balance used in reloading a prepaid SIM card and is a separate load balance from the personal load balance of the retailer.

Any person can be a retailer, because service providers sell retailer SIM cards without additional contracts. Because of this, reloading stations are common in places like the Philippines, where every block of the city and the most remote areas have reloading stations.

Load transfer
With the success of electronic reloading, Smart Communications, who introduced the service, also developed a load transfer service among prepaid subscribers. Load transfer uses the same technology used in reloading stations but uses a different method. A prepaid subscriber must key in the mobile number of the person where the credit balance must be transferred and sends to an access number designated by the service providers. Load transfers only supports small denominations and expires after 24 hours from the time of transfer.

Reward points
Electronic reloading can also be done via reward points redemption. Service providers offer subscribers reward points which are accumulated every time a subscribers uses or purchases any value added service. These points can be used to purchase electronic loads and other services depending on the number of points earned. Dito Telecommunity do offer electronic reloading using their earned reward points as a mode of payment via their Mobile App.

Automated teller machines
Banks support reloading service via automated teller machines. A menu for reloading is added to the ATM and can be used by any person with an ATM card. The denomination reloaded to a prepaid mobile phone is deducted from the bank account balance of the ATM card used.

E-wallet apps
Most E-wallet apps in the Philippines such as GCash, Maya, Coins.ph, and among others do support reloading service. Like reloading via ATMs, the denomination reloaded to a prepaid mobile phone is deducted from the e-wallet account balance.

Other subscriptions
Electronic reloads can also be offered from other subscriptions from a network provider. One example is through a prepaid mobile broadband subscription. Service providers have designed a way to incorporate reloading functions of the mobile broadband. But these service are only marketed for personal use since the idea fleshed out from the load transfer service.

Branding
In the Philippines, service providers use different branding for the electronic reload service. Smart Communications, who owns Smart and TNT, use SmartLoad, while Globe Telecom, who owns Globe, TM, GOMO and Cherry Prepaid, and formerly ABS-CBNmobile, use AutoloadMax or simply AMAX in branding of the service. The now-defunct Sun Cellular, uses XpressLoad as their branding for that service.

References

Mobile phone culture